F28, F-28 or F.28 may refer to:

Ships and boats
 Corsair F-28 a US trimaran sailboat design
 BNS Somudra Joy (F-28), a Bangladesh Navy frigate
 HMS Artifex (F28), a United Kingdom Royal Navy repair ship which served between 1939 and 1961
 HMS Cleopatra (F28), a United Kingdom Royal Navy frigate which served between 1964 and 1991
 HMS Kandahar (F28), a 1939 United Kingdom Royal Navy destroyer which saw service during World War II

Other uses 
 Enstrom F-28, a helicopter
 Fokker F28 Fellowship, a Dutch commercial passenger jet produced between 1967 and 1987
 Getrag F28/6 transmission, installed on the Opel Calibra
 F-28 (Michigan county highway)
 Fluorine-28 (F-28 or 28F), an isotope of fluorine

Ship disambiguation pages